Las Raíces Tunnel is a road tunnel in Chile.

As such, the tunnel serves as a link between the Pacific and Atlantic Oceans, from Lebu in Chile to Bahía Blanca in Argentina.

This tunnel allows only one-way traffic, which is regulated by a toll station where a fee of 400 pesos ($ USD) per car is charged. Its average traffic is about 450 vehicles daily, including some heavy fuel trucks coming from Argentina. An alternative to this tunnel is the old scenic gravel road Cuesta de Las Raíces to be taken northwards about  before the western or  before the eastern entrance.

Feasibility studies began in 1911, with final blueprints ready in 1929. Construction began in 1930 and lasted eight years, with an investment of more than 32 million Chilean pesos of that time. The railway from Púa to Lonquimay operated through it from 1956 till the 1990s.

Sources
http://edelect.latercera.cl/medio/articulo/0,0,3255_5666_107831743,00.html
https://web.archive.org/web/20080317071727/http://lonquimay.relacionarse.com/index.php/147146

References

Tunnels in Chile
Buildings and structures in La Araucanía Region
Transport in La Araucanía Region
Tunnels completed in 1956
Road tunnels